Baker Street Mill is a grade II listed smock mill at Baker Street, Orsett, Essex, England which has been part adapted to residential use on its lower two floors only.

History

Baker Street Mill is said to have been built in 1765, although a date of 1762 is recorded in the mill. The earliest firm reference for the mill is 1796, this from a sale notice in 1808. It is likely that the mill was raised a storey between 1762 and 1814. The mill was working by wind until 1914. A steam mill was built near the mill towards the end of its working life, a new boiler being supplied in 1906.

The mill gradually became more and more derelict, losing two sails in 1926 to a lightning strike. The windmill and steam mill were converted to residential accommodation in 1982.

Description

Baker Street Mill is a three-storey smock mill on a two-storey brick base, with a stage at first-floor level. The mill had four double patent sails, and the Kentish-style cap is winded by a fantail.

Mill

The mill is  diameter at the curb, the cant posts being about  square.

Sails and windshaft

Baker Street Mill has a cast-iron windshaft and four double patent sails. The windshaft was originally a wooden one. The last working sails were an odd pair, the outer pair having eight bays of four shutters and one bay of three, the inner pair having eleven bays of three shutters.

Machinery

The wooden brake wheel is of clasp arm construction,  diameter. It has been converted from compass arm construction. The rim is of elm. The Wallower is wooden, as is the upright shaft. The compass arm great spur wheel is  diameter, and has six arms. The mill originally worked two pairs of overdrift millstones, with a third pair being added later.

Fantail

Baker Street Mill was winded by an eight-bladed fantail, replacing the original hand winding by means of a Y wheel and chain, which was retained as a standby method of winding the mill.

Millers

James Woollings 1830-1839
William Woolings 1848-1886
Emma Woolings 1890-1894
Thomas Ridgewell 1898
Christopher Moore 1902
Arthur William Cocks 1908
William Scott 1910
H Lindsey 1912

List reference

External links

Windmill World webpage on Baker Street Mill

References

Industrial buildings completed in 1765
Smock mills in England
Grinding mills in the United Kingdom
Grade II listed buildings in Essex
Buildings and structures in Thurrock
Grade II listed windmills
Octagonal buildings in the United Kingdom
Windmills in Essex